Rugby League Live 3 is a sports game in the Rugby League series of Rugby League video games. Rugby League Live 3 was released on PlayStation 3, PlayStation 4, Xbox 360 and Xbox One.

Although originally announced for a Q2 2015 release, publisher, Tru Blu Entertainment has since announced that the initial release would not be met. Big Ant Studios said that when the game releases, it would be available globally. The official trailer was released on 14 August along with a launch date of 10 September 2015, confirmed by Big Ant Studios and Sony Australia. This was later confirmed by Tru Blu Entertainment on 17 August. Tru Blu Entertainment announced that old generation platforms (PS3 and Xbox 360) would not be released until 24 September 2015. The Steam (PC) version was released on 30 September 2015.

Features
Be A Pro has been newly added with the ability to take a forward or a back through the ranks of a U20 team into a full professional squad. An improved instant replay system including super slow-mo and user defined camera placement has been included. Dynamic time of day lighting with full sun movement and weather system giving dusk to night progress and mid game rain.

Career Mode has been enhanced with the ability to control a new star, rookie or create your own player.

The FanHub
Available via Steam, the beta version of the FanHub allows user to customise the in game teams, players, referees as well as leagues. At the moment, users are able to customise and create players and clubs - with other features expected to be released in the future.

An update to the FanHub was released on 22 July 2015, which included a Goal Kicking Training Drill with a global leaderboard.  Other features releases included additional licensed teams, tattoo and sponsor customisation

Licensed tournaments
   NRL
   Super League
   Kingstone Press Championship
    Kingstone Press League 1
   Intrust Super Cup
   NSW Cup
   Holden Cup
   NRL Auckland Nines

Other teams
Representative:

 City
 Country
 Indigenous All Stars
 NSW Blues
 NRL All Stars
 Queensland Maroons

International:

 Australia
 Belgium
 Canada
 Cook Islands
 Czech republic
 Denmark
 England
 Fiji
 France
 Germany
 Greece
 Hungary
 Ireland
 Italy
 Jamaica
 Latvia
 Lebanon
 Malta
 Morocco
 Netherlands
 New Zealand
 Norway
 Papua New Guinea
 Russia
 Samoa
 Scotland
 Serbia
 South Africa
 Spain
 Sweden
 Tonga
 Ukraine
 United States
 Wales

Developer:

 Big Ant
 Fanhub Black
 Fanhub Red
 Tru Blu

See also

Rugby League (video game series)

References

2015 video games
Big Ant Studios games
Games for Windows certified games
Multiplayer and single-player video games
PlayStation 3 games
PlayStation 4 games
Rugby league video games
Sports video games with career mode
Video games developed in Australia
Video games set in Australia
Video games set in England
Video games set in France
Video games set in New Zealand
Video games set in Wales
Windows games
Xbox 360 games
Xbox One games
Tru Blu Entertainment games